Desert Spring is a former settlement in Kern County, California in the Fremont Valley, south of Red Rock Canyon State Park. About .8 miles north of California State Route 58 on Bellville Road at the railroad tracks. 

The place, with natural springs, was important as a source of freshwater to the Native Americans, explorers, prospectors, and others in the Mojave Desert. The site is now registered as California Historical Landmark #476.

California Historical Landmark reads:
NO. 476 DESERT SPRING - This spring was on an old Indian horse thief trail and later (1834) Joe Walker Trail. The famished Manly-Jayhawk Death Valley parties (1849-50) were revived here after coming from Indian Wells through Last Chance Canyon. This was also a station on the Nadeau Borax Freight Road.

See also
 California Historical Landmarks in Kern County
California Historical Landmark

References

Populated places in the Mojave Desert
Former settlements in Kern County, California
Springs of California
Former Native American populated places in California
Former populated places in California
California Historical Landmarks